Jorge Mier Martínez (born 4 February 1999) is a Spanish footballer who plays as a right back for SD Amorebieta.

Club career
Born in Oviedo, Asturias, Mier was a Real Oviedo youth graduate. He made his senior debut with the reserves on 21 August 2016, starting in a 0–0 Tercera División home draw against CD Colunga.

Mier made his first team debut on 3 February 2019, coming on as a late substitute for goalscorer Diegui Johannesson in a 2–1 home defeat of Cádiz CF in the Segunda División. He then featured regularly for the B-team before being definitely promoted to the main squad on 1 July 2021, but was loaned to Unionistas de Salamanca CF in Primera División RFEF on 24 August.

On 23 August 2022, Mier terminated his contract with Oviedo, and joined SD Amorebieta the following day.

Personal life
Mier's twin brother Javi is also a footballer who plays as a midfielder. Their older brother, Tato, was also an Oviedo youth graduate.

References

External links

1999 births
Living people
Twin sportspeople
Spanish twins
Footballers from Oviedo
Spanish footballers
Association football defenders
Segunda División players
Primera Federación players
Segunda División B players
Tercera División players
Real Oviedo Vetusta players
Real Oviedo players
Unionistas de Salamanca CF players
SD Amorebieta footballers
Spain youth international footballers